The genus Galium (Rubiaceae) contains around 650 species, making it one of the largest genera of flowering plants.

A

Galium abaujense Borbás
Galium abruptorum Pomel
Galium absurdum Krendl
Galium achurense Grossh.
Galium acrophyum Hochst. ex Chiov.
Galium acuminatum Ball
Galium acutum Edgew.
Galium adhaerens Boiss. & Balansa in P.E.Boissier
Galium advenum Krendl
Galium aegeum (Stoj. & Kitam.) Ancev
Galium aetnicum Biv.
Galium afropusillum Ehrend.
Galium agrophilum Krendl
Galium aladaghense Parolly
Galium × alberti Rouy in G.Rouy & J.Foucaud
Galium albescens Hook.f.
Galium album Mill.
Galium amatymbicum Eckl. & Zeyh.
Galium amblyophyllum Schrenk in F.E.L.von Fischer & C.A.von Meyer
Galium amorginum Halácsy
Galium andrewsii A.Gray
Galium andringitrense Homolle ex Puff
Galium anfractum Sommier & Levier
Galium anguineum Ehrend. & Schönb.-Tem.
Galium angulosum A.Gray
Galium angustifolium Nutt. in J.Torrey & A.Gray
Galium angustissimum (Hausskn. ex Bornm.) Ehrend.
Galium anisophyllon Vill.
Galium ankaratrense Homolle ex Puff
Galium antarcticum Hook.f.
Galium antitauricum Ehrend.
Galium antuneziae Dempster
Galium aparine L. Cleavers, sticky weed, et al.
Galium aparinoides Forssk.
Galium aragonesii Sennen
Galium araucanum Phil.
Galium arenarium Loisel.
Galium arequipicum Dempster
Galium aretioides Boiss.
Galium argense Dempster & Ehrend.
Galium aristatum L.
Galium arkansanum A.Gray
Galium armenum Schanzer
Galium ascendens Willd. ex Spreng.
Galium aschenbornii S.Schauer
Galium asparagifolium Boiss. & Heldr. in P.E.Boissier
Galium asperifolium Wall. in W.Roxburgh
Galium asperuloides Edgew.
Galium asprellum Michx.
Galium atherodes Spreng.
Galium atlanticum Pomel
Galium aucheri Boiss.
Galium auratum Klokov
Galium australe DC.
Galium austriacum Jacq.
Galium avascense Krendl
Galium azerbayjanicum Ehrend. & Schönb.-Tem.
Galium azuayicum Dempster

B

Galium babadaghense Yıld.
Galium baeticum (Rouy) Ehrend. & Krendl
Galium baghlanense Ehrend. & Schönb.-Tem.
Galium baillonii Brandza
Galium baldense Spreng.
Galium baldensiforme Hand.-Mazz.
Galium balearicum Briq.
Galium × barcinonense Sennen
Galium basalticum Ehrend. & Schönb.-Tem.
Galium baytopianum Ehrend. & Schönb.-Tem.
Galium beckhausianum G.H.Loos
Galium belizianum Ortega Oliv.
Galium bellatulum Klokov
Galium bermudense L.
Galium bifolium S.Watson
Galium bigeminum Griseb.
Galium binifolium N.A.Wakef.
Galium blinii H.Lév.
Galium boissierianum (Steud.) Ehrend. & Krendl
Galium bolanderi A.Gray
Galium boreale L.
Galium boreoaethiopicum Puff
Galium bornmuelleri Hausskn. ex Bornm.
Galium bourgaeanum Coss. ex Batt.
Galium boyacanum Dempster
Galium brachyphyllum Schult. in J.J.Roemer & J.A.Schultes
Galium bracteatum Boiss.
Galium bredasdorpense Puff
Galium brenanii Ehrend. & Verdc.
Galium brevifolium Sm. in J.Sibthorp & J.E.Smith
Galium breviramosum Krendl
Galium brockmannii Briq.
Galium broterianum Boiss. & Reut.
Galium brunneum Munby
Galium bryoides Merr. & L.M.Perry
Galium buchtienii Dempster
Galium × buekkense Hulják
Galium bullatum Lipsky
Galium bulliforme I.Thomps.
Galium bungei Steud.
Galium bungoniense I.Thomps.
Galium buschiorum Mikheev
Galium bussei K.Schum. & K.Krause
Galium buxifolium Greene

C

Galium cajamarcense Dempster
Galium californicum Hook. & Arn.
Galium caminianum Schult. in J.J.Roemer & J.A.Schultes
Galium campanelliferum Ehrend. & Schönb.-Tem.
Galium campylotrichum Nazim. & Ehrend.
Galium canescens Kunth in F.W.H.von Humboldt
Galium cankiriense Yıld.
Galium canum Req. ex DC.
Galium capense Thunb.
Galium capitatum Bory & Chaub.
Galium cappadocicum Boiss.
Galium caprarium Natali
Galium capreum Krendl
Galium carmenicola Dempster
Galium × carmineum Beauverd
Galium carterae Dempster
Galium caspicum Steven
Galium cassium Boiss.
Galium catalinense A.Gray
Galium × centroniae Cariot
Galium ceratoamanianum Ehrend.
Galium ceratocarpon Boiss.
Galium ceratophylloides Hook.f.
Galium ceratopodum Boiss.
Galium cespitosum Lam.
Galium chaetopodum Rech.f.
Galium chekiangense Ehrend.
Galium chloroionanthum K.Schum.
Galium chloroleucum Fisch. & C.A.Mey.
Galium ciliare Hook.f.
Galium cilicicum Boiss.
Galium cinereum All.
Galium circae Krendl
Galium circaezans Michx.
Galium clausonis Pomel
Galium clementis Eastw.
Galium cliftonsmithii (Dempster) Dempster & Stebbins
Galium collomiae J.T.Howell
Galium coloradoense W.Wight
Galium comari H.Lév. & Vaniot
Galium comberi Dempster
Galium cometerhizon Lapeyr.
Galium compactum Ehrend. & McGill.
Galium concatenatum Coss.
Galium concinnum Torr. & A.Gray
Galium confertum Royle ex Hook.f.
Galium conforme Krendl
Galium consanguineum Boiss.
Galium coriaceum Bunge in C.F.von Ledebour
Galium cornigerum Boiss. & Hausskn. in P.E.Boissier
Galium coronadoense Dempster
Galium correllii Dempster
Galium corsicum Spreng.
Galium corymbosum Ruiz & Pav.
Galium cossonianum Jafri
Galium cotinoides Cham. & Schltdl.
Galium cracoviense Ehrend.
Galium crassifolium W.C.Chen
Galium craticulatum R.R.Mill
Galium crespianum Rodr.
Galium cryptanthum Hemsl.
Galium curvihirtum Ehrend. & McGill.
Galium cuspidulatum Miq.
Galium cyllenium Boiss. & Heldr. in P.E.Boissier
Galium czerepanovii Pobed. in V.L.Komarov

D

Galium dahuricum Turcz. ex Ledeb.
Galium davisii Ehrend.
Galium debile Desv.
Galium decorum Krendl
Galium decumbens (Ehrend.) Ehrend. & Schönb.-Tem.
Galium degenii Bald. ex Degen
Galium deistelii K.Krause
Galium delicatulum Boiss. & Hohen. in P.E.Boissier
Galium demissum Boiss.
Galium dempsterae B.L.Turner
Galium densum Hook.f.
Galium denticulatum Bartl. ex DC.
Galium desereticum Dempster & Ehrend.
Galium diabolense Dempster
Galium dieckii Bornm.
Galium diffusoramosum Dempster & Ehrend.
Galium × digeneum A.Kern.
Galium diphyllum (K.Schum.) Dempster
Galium diploprion Boiss. & Hohen. in P.E.Boissier
Galium divaricatum Pourr. ex Lam.
Galium domingense Iltis
Galium dumosum Boiss.
Galium duthiei R.Bhattacharjee

E

Galium echinocarpum Hayata
Galium ecuadoricum Dempster
Galium × effulgens Beck
Galium ehrenbergii Boiss.
Galium elbursense Bornm. & Gauba
Galium elegans Wall. ex Roxb.
Galium elongatum C.Presl in J.S.Presl & C.B.Presl
Galium emeryense Dempster & Ehrend.
Galium ephedroides Willk.
Galium equisetoides (Cham. & Schltdl.) Standl.
Galium ericoides Lam.
Galium eriocarpum Bartl. ex DC.
Galium eruptivum Krendl
Galium erythrorrhizon Boiss. & Reut.
Galium espiniacicum Dempster
Galium estebanii Sennen
Galium exaltatum Krendl
Galium exile Hook.f.
Galium exstipulatum P.H.Davis
Galium exsurgens Ehrend. & Schönb.-Tem.
Galium extensum Krendl

F

Galium falconeri R.Bhattacharjee
Galium fendleri A.Gray
Galium ferrugineum K.Krause
Galium festivum Krendl
Galium × fictum E.G.Camus in G.Rouy & J.Foucaud
Galium filipes Rydb.
Galium firmum Tausch
Galium fissurense Ehrend. & Schönb.-Tem.
Galium fistulosum Sommier & Levier
Galium flavescens Borbás ex Simonk. in A.J.R.Kerner
Galium flaviflorum (Trautv.) Mikheev
Galium floribundum Sm. in J.Sibthorp & J.E.Smith
Galium foliosum Munby ex Burnat & Barbey
Galium fontanesianum Pomel
Galium formosense Ohwi
Galium forrestii Diels
Galium fosbergii Dempster
Galium friedrichii N.Torres & al.
Galium fruticosum Willd.
Galium fuegianum Hook.f.
Galium fuscum M.Martens & Galeotti

G

Galium galapagoense Wiggins
Galium galiopsis (Hand.-Mazz.) Ehrend.
Galium gaudichaudii DC.
Galium geminiflorum Lowe
Galium ghilanicum Stapf
Galium gilliesii Hook. & Arn.
Galium glaberrimum Hemsl.
Galium glabrescens (Ehrend.) Dempster & Ehrend.
Galium glabriusculum Ehrend.
Galium glaciale K.Krause
Galium glandulosum Hand.-Mazz.
Galium glaucophyllum Em.Schmid
Galium glaucum L.
Galium globuliferum Hub.-Mor. & Reese
Galium gracilicaule Bacigalupo & Ehrend.
Galium graecum L.
Galium grande McClatchie
Galium grayanum Ehrend.
Galium guadalupense (Spreng.) Govaerts
Galium gymnopetalum Ehrend. & Schönb.-Tem.

H

Galium hainesii Schönb.-Tem.
Galium hallii Munz & I.M.Johnst.
Galium hardhamae Dempster
Galium hatschbachii Dempster
Galium haussknechtii Ehrend.
Galium heldreichii Halácsy
Galium hellenicum Krendl
Galium hexanarium Knjaz.
Galium hierochuntinum Bornm.
Galium hierosolymitanum L.
Galium hilendiae Dempster & Ehrend.
Galium × himmelbaurianum (Ronniger) Soó
Galium hintoniorum B.L.Turner
Galium hirtiflorum Req. ex DC.
Galium hirtum Lam.
Galium hoffmeisteri (Klotzsch) Ehrend. & Schönb.-Tem. ex R.R.Mill
Galium homblei De Wild.
Galium huancavelicum Dempster
Galium huber-morathii Ehrend. & Schönb.-Tem.
Galium humifusum M.Bieb.
Galium humile Cham. & Schltdl.
Galium × hungaricum A.Kern.
Galium hupehense Pamp.
Galium × huteri A.Kern.
Galium hypocarpium (L.) Endl. ex Griseb.
Galium hypotrichium A.Gray
Galium hypoxylon Ehrend. & Schönb.-Tem.
Galium hyrcanicum C.A.Mey.
Galium hystricocarpum Greenm.
Galium idubedae (Pau & Debeaux) Pau ex Ehrend.

I

Galium iltisii Dempster
Galium incanum Sm. in J.Sibthorp & J.E.Smith
Galium inconspicuum Phil.
Galium incrassatum Halácsy
Galium incurvum Sm. in J.Sibthorp & J.E.Smith
Galium innocuum Miq.
Galium insulare Krendl
Galium intermedium Schult.
Galium intricatum Margot & Reut.
Galium ionicum Krendl
Galium iranicum Hausskn. ex Bornm.
Galium irinae Pachom.
Galium isauricum Ehrend. & Schönb.-Tem.

J

Galium × jansenii Kloos
Galium japonicum Makino
Galium × jarynae Wol.
Galium javalambrense López Udias
Galium javanicum Blume
Galium jemense Kotschy
Galium jepsonii Hilend & J.T.Howell
Galium johnstonii Dempster & Stebbins
Galium jolyi Batt.
Galium judaicum Boiss.
Galium jungermannioides Boiss.
Galium junghuhnianum Miq.
Galium juniperinum Standl.

K

Galium kaganense R.Bhattacharjee
Galium kahelianum Deflers
Galium kamtschaticum Steller ex Schult. in J.J.Roemer & J.A.Schultes
Galium karakulense Pobed. in V.L.Komarov
Galium karataviense (Pavlov) Pobed.
Galium kasachstanicum Pachom.
Galium kenyanum Verdc.
Galium kerneri Degen & Dörfl.
Galium khorasanense Griff.
Galium kikumugura Ohwi
Galium killipii Dempster & Ehrend.
Galium kinuta Nakai & H.Hara
Galium kitaibelianum Schult. in J.J.Roemer & J.A.Schultes
Galium × kondratjukii Ostapko
Galium kuetzingii Boiss. & Buhse
Galium kunmingense Ehrend.
Galium kurdicum Boiss. & Hohen. in P.E.Boissier

L

Galium labradoricum (Wiegand) Wiegand
Galium laconicum Boiss. & Heldr. in P.E.Boissier
Galium lacrimiforme Dempster
Galium laevigatum L.
Galium lahulense Ehrend. & Schönb.-Tem.
Galium lanceolatum (Torr. & A.Gray) Torr.
Galium lanuginosum Lam.
Galium × lanulosum Ostapko
Galium lasiocarpum Boiss.
Galium latifolium Michx.
Galium latoramosum Clos in C.Gay
Galium leiocarpum I.Thomps.
Galium leptogonium I.Thomps.
Galium leptum Phil.
Galium libanoticum Ehrend.
Galium lilloi Hicken
Galium × lindbergii Giraudias
Galium linearifolium Turcz.
Galium liratum N.A.Wakef.
Galium litorale Guss.
Galium lovcense Urum.
Galium lucidum All.

M

Galium macedonicum Krendl
Galium magellanicum Hook.f.
Galium magellense Ten.
Galium magnifolium (Dempster) Dempster
Galium mahadivense G.Singh
Galium malickyi Krendl
Galium mandonii Britton
Galium maneauense P.Royen
Galium marchandii Roem. & Schult.
Galium margaceum Ehrend. & Schönb.-Tem.
Galium margaritaceum A.Kern.
Galium maritimum L.
Galium martirense Dempster & Stebbins
Galium masafueranum Skottsb.
Galium matthewsii A.Gray
Galium maximowiczii (Kom.) Pobed.
Galium mechudoense Dempster
Galium megacyttarion R.R.Mill
Galium megalanthum Boiss.
Galium megalospermum All.
Galium megapotamicum Spreng.
Galium melanantherum Boiss.
Galium meliodorum (Beck) Fritsch
Galium membranaceum Ehrend.
Galium mexicanum Kunth in F.W.H.von Humboldt
Galium microchiasma Gilli
Galium microlobum I.Thomps.
Galium microphyllum A.Gray
Galium migrans Ehrend. & McGill.
Galium minutissimum T.Shimizu
Galium minutulum Jord.
Galium mirum Rech.f.
Galium mite Boiss. & Hohen. in P.E.Boissier
Galium moldavicum (Dobrocz.) Franco
Galium mollugo L.
Galium monachinii Boiss. & Heldr. in P.E.Boissier
Galium monasterium Krendl
Galium monticola Sond. in W.H.Harvey & auct. suc. (eds.)
Galium montis-arerae Merxm. & Ehrend.
Galium moranii Dempster
Galium morii Hayata
Galium mucroniferum Sond. in W.H.Harvey & auct. suc. (eds.)
Galium muelleri (K.Schum.) Dempster
Galium multiflorum Kellogg
Galium munzii Hilend & J.T.Howell
Galium murale (L.) All.
Galium murbeckii Maire
Galium muricatum W.Wight
Galium × mutabile Besser

N

Galium nabelekii Ehrend. & Schönb.-Tem.
Galium nakaii Kudô
Galium nankotaizanum Ohwi
Galium × neglectum Le Gall ex Gren. & Godr.
Galium nepalense Ehrend. & Schönb.-Tem.
Galium nevadense Boiss. & Reut. in P.E.Boissier
Galium nigdeense Yıld.
Galium nigricans Boiss.
Galium nigroramosum (Ehrend.) Dempster
Galium nolitangere Ball
Galium noricum Ehrend.
Galium normanii Dahl
Galium novoguineense Diels
Galium noxium (A.St.-Hil.) Dempster
Galium numidicum Pomel
Galium nupercreatum Popov
Galium nuttallii A.Gray

O

Galium obliquum Vill.
Galium obovatum Kunth in F.W.H.von Humboldt
Galium obtusum Bigelow
Galium octonarium (Klokov) Pobed.
Galium odoratum (L.) Scop.
Galium oelandicum Ehrend.
Galium olgae Klokov
Galium olivetorum Le Houér
Galium olympicum Boiss.
Galium ophiolithicum Krendl
Galium oreganum Britton
Galium oreophilum Krendl
Galium oresbium Greenm.
Galium orizabense Hemsl.
Galium oshtenicum Ehrend. & Schanzer ex Mikheev
Galium ossirwaense K.Krause
Galium ostenianum (Standl.) Dempster
Galium ovalleanum Phil.

P

Galium pabulosum Sommier & Levier
Galium palaeoitalicum Ehrend.
Galium palustre L.
Galium pamiroalaicum Pobed. in V.L.Komarov
Galium pamphylicum Boiss. & Heldr. in P.E.Boissier
Galium paniculatum (Bunge) Pobed.
Galium papilliferum Ehrend. & Schönb.-Tem.
Galium papillosum Lapeyr.
Galium papuanum Wernham
Galium paradoxum Maxim.
Galium parishii Hilend & J.T.Howell
Galium parisiense L.
Galium parvulum Hub.-Mor. ex Ehrend. & Schönb.-Tem.
Galium paschale Forssk.
Galium pastorale Krendl
Galium patzkeanum G.H.Loos
Galium peloponnesiacum Ehrend. & Krendl
Galium penduliflorum Boiss.
Galium pendulum Greenm.
Galium penicillatum Boiss.
Galium pennellii Dempster
Galium peplidifolium Boiss.
Galium perralderi Coss.
Galium peruvianum Dempster & Ehrend.
Galium pestalozzae Boiss.
Galium petrae Oliv. ex Hart
Galium philippianum Dempster
Galium philippinense Merr.
Galium philistaeum Boiss.
Galium pilosum Aiton
Galium pisiferum Boiss.
Galium pisoderium Krendl
Galium platygalium (Maxim.) Pobed.
Galium plumosum Rusby
Galium poiretianum Ball
Galium pojarkovae Pobed. in V.L.Komarov
Galium polyacanthum (Baker) Puff
Galium polyanthum I.Thomps.
Galium × pomeranicum Retz.
Galium porrigens Dempster
Galium praemontanum Mardal.
Galium praetermissum Greenm.
Galium × pralognense Beauverd
Galium prattii Cufod.
Galium pringlei Greenm.
Galium problematicum (Ehrend.) Ehrend. & Schönb.-Tem.
Galium procurrens Ehrend.
Galium productum Lowe
Galium × prolazense Nyár.
Galium proliferum A.Gray
Galium propinquum A.Cunn.
Galium pruinosum Boiss.
Galium pseudoaristatum Schur
Galium × pseudoboreale Klokov
Galium pseudocapitatum Hub.-Mor. ex Ehrend. & Schönb.-Tem.
Galium pseudohelveticum Ehrend.
Galium pseudokurdicum (Ehrend.) Schönb.-Tem.
Galium pseudorivale Tzvelev
Galium pseudotriflorum Dempster & Ehrend.
Galium psilocladum Ehrend.
Galium pterocarpum Ehrend.
Galium pulvinatum Boiss.
Galium pumilio Standl.
Galium pumilum Murray
Galium pusillosetosum H.Hara
Galium pusillum L.
Galium pyrenaicum Gouan

Q

Galium qaradaghense Schönb.-Tem.
Galium × querceticola Wol.
Galium quichense Dempster

R

Galium radulifolium Ehrend. & Schönb.-Tem.
Galium ramboi Dempster
Galium rebae R.R.Mill
Galium reiseri Halácsy
Galium × retzii Bouchard
Galium rhodopeum Velen.
Galium richardianum (Gillies ex Hook. & Arn.) Endl. ex Walp.
Galium rigidifolium Krendl
Galium rivale (Sm.) Griseb.
Galium roddii Ehrend. & McGill.
Galium rosellum (Boiss.) Boiss. & Reut.
Galium rotundifolium L.
Galium rourkei Puff
Galium rubidiflorum Dempster
Galium rubioides L.
Galium rubrum L.
Galium runcinatum Ehrend. & Schönb.-Tem.
Galium rupifragum Ehrend.
Galium ruwenzoriense (Cortesi) Ehrend.
Galium rzedowskii Dempster

S

Galium sacrorum Krendl
Galium saipalense Ehrend. & Schönb.-Tem.
Galium salsugineum Krylov & Serg.
Galium salwinense Hand.-Mazz.
Galium samium Krendl
Galium samuelssonii Ehrend.
Galium saturejifolium Trevir.
Galium saurense Litv.
Galium saxatile L.
Galium saxosum (Chaix) Breistr.
Galium scabrelloides Puff
Galium scabrellum K.Schum.
Galium scabrifolium (Boiss.) Hausskn.
Galium scabrum L.
Galium schlumbergeri Boiss.
Galium × schmidelyi Chenevard & W.Wolf
Galium schmidii Arrigoni
Galium × schneebergense Ronniger
Galium schoenbeck-temesyae Ehrend.
Galium scioanum Chiov.
Galium scopulorum Schönb.-Tem.
Galium seatonii Greenm.
Galium sellowianum (Cham.) Walp.
Galium semiamictum Klokov
Galium serpenticum Dempster
Galium serpylloides Royle ex Hook.f.
Galium setaceum Lam.
Galium setuliferum Ehrend. & Schönb.-Tem.
Galium shanense R.Bhattacharjee
Galium shepardii Post
Galium shepherdii Jung-Mend.
Galium sichuanense Ehrend.
Galium sidamense Chiov. ex Chiarugi
Galium sieheanum Ehrend.
Galium simense Fresen.
Galium similii Pavlov
Galium sinaicum (Delile ex Decne.) Boiss.
Galium smithreitzii Dempster
Galium sojakii Ehrend. & Schönb.-Tem.
Galium songaricum Schrenk in F.E.L.von Fischer & C.A.von Meyer
Galium sorgerae Ehrend. & Schönb.-Tem.
Galium sparsiflorum W.Wight
Galium spathulatum I.Thomps.
Galium speciosum Krendl
Galium sphagnophilum (Greenm.) Dempster
Galium spurium L.
Galium stebbinsii ined.
Galium stellatum Kellogg
Galium stenophyllum Baker
Galium stepparum Ehrend. & Schönb.-Tem.
Galium sterneri Ehrend.
Galium subfalcatum Nazim. & Ehrend.
Galium subnemorale Klokov & Zaver.
Galium subtrifidum Reinw. ex Blume
Galium subtrinervium Ehrend. & Schönb.-Tem.
Galium subuliferum Sommier & Levier
Galium subvelutinum (DC.) K.Koch
Galium subvillosum Sond. in W.H.Harvey & auct. suc. (eds.)
Galium sudeticum Tausch
Galium suecicum (Sterner) Ehrend.
Galium suffruticosum Hook. & Arn.
Galium sungpanense Cufod.
Galium surinamense Dempster
Galium sylvaticum L.

T

Galium taiwanense Masam.
Galium takasagomontanum Masam.
Galium talaveranum Ortega Oliv. & Devesa
Galium tanganyikense Ehrend. & Verdc.
Galium tarokoense Hayata
Galium taygeteum Krendl
Galium tendae Rchb.f. in H.G.L.Reichenbach
Galium tenuissimum M.Bieb.
Galium terrae-reginae Ehrend. & McGill.
Galium tetraphyllum Nazim. & Ehrend.
Galium texense A.Gray
Galium thasium Stoj. & Kitanov
Galium thiebautii Ehrend.
Galium thracicum Krendl
Galium thunbergianum Eckl. & Zeyh.
Galium thymifolium Boiss. & Heldr. in P.E.Boissier
Galium tianschanicum Popov
Galium timeroyi Jord.
Galium tinctorium L.
Galium tmoleum Boiss.
Galium tokyoense Makino
Galium tolosianum Boiss. & Kotschy in P.E.Boissier
Galium tomentosum Thunb.
Galium tortumense Ehrend. & Schönb.-Tem.
Galium transcarpaticum Stojko & Tasenk.
Galium trichocarpum DC.
Galium tricornutum Dandy
Galium trifidum L.
Galium trifloriforme Kom.
Galium triflorum Michx.
Galium trilobum Colenso
Galium trinioides Pomel
Galium trojanum Ehrend.
Galium truniacum (Ronniger) Ronniger in A.J.R.Kerner von Marilaun
Galium tubiflorum Ehrend.
Galium tuncelianum Yıld.
Galium tunetanum Lam.
Galium turgaicum Knjaz.
Galium turkestanicum Pobed. in V.L.Komarov
Galium tyraicum Klokov

U

Galium uliginosum L.
Galium uncinulatum DC.
Galium undulatum Puff
Galium uniflorum Michx.
Galium uruguayense Bacigalupo

V

Galium valantioides M.Bieb.
Galium valdepilosum Heinr.Braun
Galium valentinum Lange
Galium vartanii Grossh.
Galium vassilczenkoi Pobed. in V.L.Komarov
Galium velenovskyi Ancev
Galium verrucosum Huds.
Galium verticillatum Danthoine ex Lam.
Galium verum L.
Galium × viciosorum Sennen & Pau
Galium vile (Cham. & Schltdl.) Dempster
Galium virgatum Nutt. in J.Torrey & A.Gray
Galium viridiflorum Boiss. & Reut.
Galium viscosum Vahl
Galium volcanense Dempster
Galium volhynicum Pobed.

W

Galium watsonii (A.Gray) A.Heller
Galium weberbaueri K.Krause
Galium wendelboi Ehrend. & Schönb.-Tem.
Galium werdermannii Standl.
Galium wigginsii Dempster
Galium wrightii A.Gray

X
Galium xeroticum (Klokov) Pobed.
Galium xylorrhizum Boiss. & A.Huet in P.E.Boissier

Y
Galium yunnanense H.Hara & C.Y.Wu

Z
Galium zabense Ehrend.

References

External links

list
Galium